Golnaz Modarresi Ghavami (born 12 October 1966) is an Iranian linguist and associate professor of linguistics at Allameh Tabataba'i University. She is known for her research on Persian phonology and phonetics. Her textbook on phonetics is widely taught in Iranian universities. Modarresi Ghavami received a BA in English  translation  from Allameh Tabataba'i University in  1989, an MA in linguistics from Ferdowsi University in 1992 and a PhD in linguistics from University of Texas at Austin in 2002.

Books
 Phonetics :The Scientific Study of Speech, Golnaz Modarresi Ghavami, Tehran: SAMT 
 A Descriptive Dictionary of Phonology and Phonetics, Golnaz Modarresi Ghavami, Tehran: Elmi

References

External links
 Golnaz Modarresi Ghavami at Allameh Tabataba'i University 

1966 births
Living people
Linguists from Iran
Iranian phonologists
Phoneticians
University of Texas at Austin College of Liberal Arts alumni
Ferdowsi University of Mashad alumni
Allameh Tabataba'i University alumni
Academic staff of Allameh Tabataba'i University
English–Persian translators